Siriné Doucouré (born 8 April 2002) is a French professional footballer who plays as a forward for the Ligue 1 club Lorient.

Career
Doucouré is a youth product of the academies of Paris FC and Châteauroux. On 9 June 2020, he signed his first professional contract with Châteauroux. He made his professional debut with Châteauroux in a 1–0 Ligue 2 loss to Valenciennes on 12 September 2020. On 1 September 2022, he transferred to Lorient in the Ligue 1 on a 4-year contract.

Personal life
Born in France, is of Malian descent.

References

External links
 

2002 births
Living people
French people of Malian descent
Sportspeople from Nogent-sur-Marne
Footballers from Val-de-Marne
French footballers
Association football forwards
Ligue 1 players
Ligue 2 players
Championnat National players
Championnat National 3 players
LB Châteauroux players
FC Lorient players